The two-lined monocle bream (Scolopsis bilineata) is a species of threadfin bream native to the Indian Ocean and the western Pacific Ocean. They are carnivorous, preying on smaller fishes, as well as benthic invertebrates. This species is sought-after by local peoples for food and can also be found in the aquarium trade.

The two-lined monocle bream exhibits biofluorescence, that is, when illuminated by blue or ultraviolet light, it re-emits it as green, and appears differently than under white light illumination (only stripes on the upper front part are visible). Biofluorescence may assist in intraspecific communication and camouflage, blending the fish with green-fluorescing Acropora corals.

References

External links
 
 
 Two-line Monocle Bream @ Fishes of Australia

Scolopsis
Fish of the Indian Ocean
Marine fish of Northern Australia
Fish described in 1793